Sciocorini is a tribe of stink bugs in the family Pentatomidae.

Genera
The following are included in BioLib.cz:
 Adelaidena Distant, 1910
 Decellela Schouteden, 1964
 Dyroderes Spinola, 1837
 Eupododus Kirkaldy, 1904
 Kapunda Distant, 1911
 Menaccarus Amyot & Serville, 1843
 Menedemus Distant, 1899
 Phaeocoris Jakovlev, 1887
 Psammotisia Kment, 2006
 Sciocoris Fallén, 1829
 Tisia Hoberlandt, 1993
 Trincavellius Distant, 1900

References

 Henry, Thomas J., and Richard C. Froeschner, eds. (1988). Catalog of the Heteroptera, or True Bugs, of Canada and the Continental United States, xix + 958.
 Thomas J. Henry, Richard C. Froeschner. (1988). Catalog of the Heteroptera, True Bugs of Canada and the Continental United States. Brill Academic Publishers.

Further reading

External links

 
Pentatominae
Hemiptera tribes